This article is about the particular significance of the year 1795 to Wales and its people.

Incumbents

Lord Lieutenant of Anglesey - Henry Paget 
Lord Lieutenant of Brecknockshire and Monmouthshire – Henry Somerset, 5th Duke of Beaufort
Lord Lieutenant of Caernarvonshire - Thomas Bulkeley, 7th Viscount Bulkeley
Lord Lieutenant of Cardiganshire – Wilmot Vaughan, 1st Earl of Lisburne
Lord Lieutenant of Carmarthenshire – John Vaughan  
Lord Lieutenant of Denbighshire – Richard Myddelton (until 2 April)  
Lord Lieutenant of Flintshire - Sir Roger Mostyn, 5th Baronet 
Lord Lieutenant of Glamorgan – John Stuart, 1st Marquess of Bute 
Lord Lieutenant of Merionethshire - Sir Watkin Williams-Wynn, 5th Baronet
Lord Lieutenant of Montgomeryshire – George Herbert, 2nd Earl of Powis
Lord Lieutenant of Pembrokeshire – Richard Philipps, 1st Baron Milford
Lord Lieutenant of Radnorshire – Thomas Harley

Bishop of Bangor – John Warren
Bishop of Llandaff – Richard Watson
Bishop of St Asaph – Lewis Bagot
Bishop of St Davids – William Stuart

Events
8 April - George, Prince of Wales, marries his first cousin, Princess Caroline of Brunswick.
June - Cecilia Thrale, youngest daughter of Hester Thrale, elopes with John Meredith Mostyn, a member of the prominent Anglesey family.
July - Ezekiel Hughes, Edward Bebb and others leave Llanbryn-mair on foot, bound for Philadelphia.
September - Hester Thrale and her second husband, Gabriele Piozzi, settle in Wales, where they begin renovating Bachygraig.
date unknown
Samuel Homfray brings an unsuccessful suit, at Hereford Assizes, of the commoners against the Dowlais Company.
The events of the French Revolution cause corn prices to rise dramatically, but wages do not follow. Food riots are commonplace across Wales for the several years after.
The Universal British Directory includes the first-ever entry for Merthyr Tydfil.
Copper bolts forged at Parys Mountain are used in the construction of an American warship, the USS Constitution.

Arts and literature

New books
Thomas Evans (Tomos Glyn Cothi) - The Miscellaneous Repository neu Y Drysorfa Gymysgedig
John Jones (Jac Glan-y-gors) - Seren Tan Gwmmwl

Births
18 January - Edward Lloyd-Mostyn, 2nd Baron Mostyn, politician (died 1884)
5 August - George Rice-Trevor, 4th Baron Dynevor, politician (died 1869)
December - John Davies, philosopher (died 1861)
7 December - Samuel George Homfray, industrialist (died 1882)
11 December - Thomas Taylor Griffith, surgeon (died 1876)
date unknown - Zephaniah Williams, Chartist (died 1874) 
probable - Maria Jane Williams, musician (d. 1873)

Deaths
25 January - Morgan Edwards, Baptist historian, 72 
2 April – Richard Myddelton, Lord Lieutenant of Denbighshire, 69
11 March - William Mostyn Owen, landowner and politician, 72/3
May - David Ellis, clergyman and poet, 58 
20 August - William Jones, poet, antiquary and radical 71 
14 October - Henry Owen, theologian, 79

References

Wales